The Essex Women's cricket team is the women's representative cricket team for the English historic county of Essex. They play their home games at various grounds across the county, including Toby Howe Cricket Ground, Billericay and Garon Park, Southend-on-Sea. They are captained by Kelly Castle. In 2019, they played in Division Two of the final season of the Women's County Championship, and have since played in the Women's Twenty20 Cup. They are partnered with the regional side Sunrisers.

History

1949–2000: Early History
Essex Women played their first recorded match in 1949, against Buckinghamshire Women. Over the following years, Essex went on to play various one-off matches, most often against local Second XI teams.

2000– : Women's County Championship
Essex joined the Women's County Championship in 2001, competing in Division Three, in which they came third, with two victories. They played in the bottom tier of the Championship until 2008, when they were promoted to Division Two. In Division Two, Essex performed strongly, finishing third and second in their first two seasons before being promoted in 2011. In a rain-hit 2012 season, Essex then finished second in Division One, behind Kent. After this, however, Essex fell away, being relegated from Division One in 2014, and then again from Division Two in 2016. They managed to bounce straight back, winning Division 3C in 2017, and playing in Division Two ever since. Meanwhile, in the Women's Twenty20 Cup, Essex have been a volatile side: when the tournament was regionalised in its early years, Essex bounced between Divisions One and Two of the South section. Since, they briefly fell into Division 3 in 2018, but apart from this have played in Division 2, achieving their best finish of 3rd in 2015. In 2021, they competed in the South East Group of the Twenty20 Cup, but finished bottom. They topped their group in the 2022 Women's Twenty20 Cup, but lost to Suffolk in the group final. The side has also competed in the Women's London Championship since 2020.

Players

Current squad
Based on appearances in the 2022 season. denotes players with international caps.

Notable players
Players who have played for Essex and played internationally are listed below, in order of first international appearance (given in brackets):

 Lucy Doolan (2008)
 Sian Ruck (2009)
 Beth MacGregor (2010)
 Beth Langston (2013)
 Kristen Beams (2014)
 Leigh Kasperek (2015)
 Catherine Dalton (2015)
 Sterre Kalis (2018)
 Mady Villiers (2019)
 Heather Graham (2019)
 Sharanya Sadarangani (2020)

Seasons

Women's County Championship

Women's Twenty20 Cup

See also
 Essex County Cricket Club
 Sunrisers (women's cricket)

References

Women
Women's cricket teams in England